Vernouillet may refer to:
 Vernouillet, Eure-et-Loir, France
 Vernouillet, Yvelines, France
 Vernouillet Airport, near Vernouillet, Eure-et-Loir